Jovana Rogić (born 2 August 1988) is a Serbian former judoka and sambist. She won the IJF Grand Slam in Rio de Janeiro in 2012.

As a senior, Rogić won 13 World Cup medals between 2012 and 2017 in 13 different cities. During her youth career, she won a silver medal at the European U23 Championships in 2010, as well as a silver medal at European Youth Olympic Festival (EYOF) and a bronze medal at European Cadet Championships in 2003, respectively.

She also competed in Sambo and won bronze medals at World Sambo Championships in 2016 and 2017.

Rogić announced her retirement on 14 June 2021.

Achievements

References

External links
 

1988 births
Living people
Serbian female judoka
Serbian sambo practitioners
Sportspeople from Novi Sad
European Games competitors for Serbia
Judoka at the 2015 European Games
Judoka at the 2019 European Games